Chahaki may refer to:
 Chahaki, Fars
 Chahaki, Kerman